Quintin Geldenhuys (born 19 June 1981) is a South Africa-born Italian rugby union player. Geldenhuys, who played lock, represented the Italian URC franchise Zebre. He made his debut for Italy against Australia on 13 June 2009. He qualified for Italy through residency. He played 11 games, starting 11, playing 796 minutes in the 2015-2016 Guinness Pro12 series. Geldenhuys is currently the Director of Rugby at Trio High School in Kroonstad the Northern Free State region of South Africa.

References

1981 births
Living people
Aironi players
Alumni of Monument High School
Italian rugby union players
South African rugby union players
Rugby union locks
Italy international rugby union players
Zebre Parma players
Afrikaner people
People from Klerksdorp
Pumas (Currie Cup) players
South African emigrants to Italy
South African people of Dutch descent
Rugby union players from Gauteng